The Halmahera flowerpecker (Dicaeum schistaceiceps) is a species of bird in the family Dicaeidae. It is endemic to Halmahera in Indonesia. Its natural habitats are subtropical or tropical moist lowland forest and subtropical or tropical moist montane forest.  It was recently considered conspecific with the Buru flowerpecker.

References

Halmahera flowerpecker
Birds of Halmahera
Halmahera flowerpecker
Halmahera flowerpecker